Petelinje is a settlement north of Pivka in the Inner Carniola region of Slovenia.

The local church in the settlement is dedicated to Saint Bartholomew and belongs to the Parish of Pivka.

References

External links
Petelinje on Geopedia

Populated places in the Municipality of Pivka